Anavia Battle (born March 28, 1999) is an American sprinter.

As a graduate of Wayne Memorial High School (class of 2017) from Inkster, Michigan, Battle was the 2021 Big Ten outdoor champion in both the 100 and 200 metres and ran a leg on the Big Ten champion 4×100 metres relay while at Ohio State. At the US Olympic trials in Eugene, Oregon, Battle qualified for the U.S. women's Olympic team for the delayed 2020 Summer Olympics after finishing third in the 200m race on June 26 with a new personal best time of 21.95 seconds.

References

External links 
 
 
 
 Anavia Battle bio Ohio State Buckeyes
  Anavia Battle bio Olympics
 Anavia Battle Wayne Memorial High School results
 Anavia Battle Ohio State results

1999 births
Living people
American female sprinters
Ohio State Buckeyes women's track and field athletes
Track and field athletes from Michigan
People from Inkster, Michigan
Athletes (track and field) at the 2020 Summer Olympics
Olympic female sprinters
Olympic track and field athletes of the United States
21st-century American women
Ohio State University alumni